Turriaco is a town and comune in the province of Gorizia (Friuli-Venezia Giulia, northern Italy) near the Isonzo river.

Its name comes from the ancient Latin name "Turris Aquae", the tower of the water.

References

Cities and towns in Friuli-Venezia Giulia